The Men's team sabre event took place on November 9, 2010 at Grand Palais.

Sabre team

References

External links
 Bracket

2010 World Fencing Championships